The Computer Museum of America is located in Roswell, Georgia and opened in July 2019 to coincide with the fiftieth anniversary of the Moon landing. It is the largest technology museum on the East Coast with the opening of Phase I and when completed will be among the largest in the world. 

The museum was founded by Lonnie Mimms, who originally operated an Apple pop up museum, and includes rare artifacts including a Cray-1, Apple I, Apple Lisa, a Pixar Image Computer, an Enigma, a Xerox Alto, a MITS Altair 8800 and more.  The collection includes the contents of the former Bugbook Historical Computer Museum.  While the museum shows many items, they are only a fraction of his 300,000 plus in the collection.

References

External links 
 
 

Museums in Fulton County, Georgia
Computer museums in the United States
Museums established in 2019
History museums in Georgia (U.S. state)